Star Ocean: The Second Story is an action role-playing video game developed by tri-Ace and published by Enix for the PlayStation. It is the second game in the Star Ocean series and the first game in the series to be released outside Japan, arriving in North America in May 1999 and Europe in April 2000, by Sony Computer Entertainment. Taking place in a science fantasy universe, the story centers around a young man named Claude Kenni, a cadet from a space-faring Earth organization who is stranded on an undeveloped, medieval-level planet. There, he meets several companions and must stop a plot from an evil organization that spans multiple worlds before finding his way home. The game was the basis of manga and anime adaptations.

An enhanced remaster called Star Ocean: Second Evolution was developed by TOSE, later released for the PlayStation Portable in April 2008 in Japan, and 2009 in North America, Europe, and Australia. It features newly animated cutscenes by Production I.G, a re-recorded soundtrack, and additional story elements.

Second Evolution was released for PlayStation 4 and PlayStation Vita in Japan during October 2015 and later PlayStation 3 in December 2015. The Download Version features enhanced graphics and BGM, a new theme song, and DLC. Square Enix never planned to release this version outside of Japan.

Gameplay
The game gives the player the choice of playing as the human Claude or the Nedian Rena, with the journey evolving and ending differently depending on the choices one makes. There are ten other playable characters in the game, though the player can only recruit six of them to fill out their eight-member party, and some recruitment choices will make other characters no longer available. The Second Storys gameplay is broadly similar to that of most RPGs. The player goes from town to town and dungeon to dungeon, following the central story and occasionally branching off to perform side quests. Characters gain Experience Points from battle and level up as a result, becoming gradually stronger as time passes and more battles are fought.

Battles place in real time, during which the player has manual control over their character, as opposed to choosing options from a menu. Battles take place on a broad battlefield, over which the player's character can move without limit, allowing them to trade blows face-to-face with the enemy or circle around for a flanking attack. The other party members (up to 3 others) are controlled by the game's AI; the player may change an ally's strategy to one of six different pre-determined options (such as "Spread out and attack", "Save your Magic Points", and "Stand Still and Don't Do Anything").

Nine different batches of skills are sold in in-game shops; once unlocked this way, they must be learned by committing battle-earned "Skill Points" to them. Some skills raise a character's statistics, some unlock Specialty abilities, and some provide bonuses in battle (such as the ability to counter-attack).  Specialties allow the characters to create a wide variety of items, and include Herbal medicine, Cooking, Writing, Composing and Musicianship, Pickpocketing and Training. Furthermore, the entire party can contribute to "Super Specialty" skills such as "Master Chef", Blacksmithing, Publishing and "Reverse Side", which allows the character to counterfeit valuable items at the risk of lowering their allies' opinion of them. Every item created has some sort of tangible benefit (foods restore Hit Points and/or Magic Points, training increases the gain in Experience Points, and written novels can be submitted to a publisher, with royalties collectable later) but every attempt requires the expenditure of a consumable item, and may fail to produce anything useful.

A mechanic called "Private Actions" allows the player to influence the relations between their characters. During a "Private Action", the player's party temporarily breaks up during a visit to a town, with each character going their own way to shop, visit friends and family, or relax. The player's main character (either Claude or Rena) can then interact with their allies, often with the option of making one of those allies like another character more or less. This "relationship point" mechanic can have a major effect in battle—if Character A's close friend is felled, Character A will get major combat bonuses for a short time—and also determines what ending the player will see, as each party member's scene plays out differently depending on who they befriended. There are 86 possible endings.

Plot
Star Ocean: The Second Story takes place in S.D 366 (A.D 2452), twenty years after the original game, Star Ocean. The game tells the stories of Claude C. Kenni, son of Ronyx J. Kenni, and Rena Lanford, a young girl living on the planet Expel. Claude, having recently been commissioned as an Ensign in the Earth Federation, is given his first mission under the supervision of his father. This first mission is to survey the planet Milocinia (renamed Milokeenia in the PSP port), where a mysterious energy field appears. Finding a mysterious device on Milocinia, Claude begins to examine it close-up, despite orders to keep away from it. As he approaches, the machine activates, teleporting him to Expel. Once on Expel, Claude meets Rena who mistakes him for the "Hero of Light," spoken of in legends on Expel because he wields a "Sword of Light" (actually the standard-issue Phase Gun all Federation officers carry) and is dressed in "alien raiments." She takes him back to her village, Arlia, for corroboration.

In Arlia, it is explained to Claude that a meteorite crashed into Expel. Almost immediately afterwards, monsters began appearing, and natural disasters occurred with increasing frequency and intensity. Believing that these events were related, the people of Expel called the meteorite the "Sorcery Globe". Though he explains that he is not the Hero of Light, Claude offers to investigate the Sorcery Globe, in the hopes that it might help lead him home. Rena assists him as his native guide and hopes to find knowledge about her origin, being an orphan.

Though their journey takes them the long way around, Claude and Rena (and whichever characters the player decides to recruit) manage to travel across Expel and finally reach the Sorcery Globe and encounter the Ten Wise Men. The Sorcery Globe, which the Ten Wise Men call the "Quadratic Sphere", is a device they planted on Expel in order to steer it into a massive energy formation called Energy Nede, from which the Ten Wise Men were exiled thousands of years ago. It is their hope to return to Energy Nede using Expel as a vessel.  They succeed and the entire planet of Expel is destroyed by its collision with Energy Nede.

After engaging the Ten Wise Men in battle, they are defeated. Claude and Rena survive due to being within the teleportation zone cast by the Ten Wise Men as the travel to Energy Nede. They are met by Mayor Narl who explains who the Ten Wise Men are, why they were exiled, and that, now that they are back, they hope to destroy the entire universe using advanced Heraldry (magic). Narl furthermore announces that Energy Nede has the ability to restore Expel by using powerful Heraldry to turn back time, but this is only possible if the Ten Wise Men are defeated.  Claude and Rena agree to help in the resistance, and embark on various voyages to strengthen themselves, obtain information and learn about the enemy.

Eventually Claude and Rena along with their friends assault the Ten Wise Men's stronghold at Fienal, where they put an end to the enemy once and for all. The ending is composed of scenes describing the fates of the party's characters, and changes slightly depending on if you discovered the Ten Wise Men's true identity and " raison d'être " through the means of Private Actions.

Development
Enix opted to use sprites for characters in order to realize an anime style of character visuals that they felt was not yet possible with polygonal models.

Second Evolution
Star Ocean: Second Evolution is an enhanced remaster of Star Ocean: The Second Story for the PSP, ported by TOSE. It serves as a sequel to Star Ocean: First Departure. The first details of the game were revealed at the "Star Ocean Special Stage" during the Square Enix Party 2007. Yoshinori Yamagishi, producer of the series, stated that he wants the remakes to feel as though they are completely new games. It was released in Japan on April 2, 2008, in North America on January 19, 2009, in Australia on February 12, 2009, and in Europe on February 13, 2009.

Second Evolution features new content (many skills were completely remade, as well the combat system being slightly refined), including new playable character. 13 new endings (for a total number of 99–100 endings). Production I.G provided new artwork and animated cutscenes for the game. There are new voice actors and extensive amounts of new, fully voiced dialogue- The opening song is "Start", performed by Scandal.

Hori, the Japanese game peripheral manufacturer released a Second Evolution-branded PSP accessory set alongside the game on April 2, 2008. The kit included a limited edition gray PSP case with the Star Ocean logo, matching headphones, a cell phone strap, and 2 UMD cases to hold both First Departure and Second Evolution games.

Second Evolution was later ported by Gemdrops and producer Yoshinori Yamagishi to PlayStation 4 and PlayStation Vita in Japan during October 2015 followed by PlayStation 3 in December 2015. The Download Version features enhanced graphics and BGM, a new theme song and DLC to help you in the game. Square Enix currently has no plans to release it outside of Japan.

Reception

Star Ocean: The Second Story was a commercial success, having sold 1.094 million copies worldwide, with 724,000 copies sold in Japan alone and 370,000 copies sold overseas. It was the 13th best-selling game of 1998 in Japan. However, it did not sell enough copies in North America to be re-released in the Greatest Hits range.

The game received favourable reviews on release and was lauded for innovative gameplay elements not previously seen in the genre, while borrowing some of the best features of popular JRPG Final Fantasy VII. While most reviewers gave positive reviews, some considered the game only mediocre.  Jeff Lundrigan reviewed the PlayStation version of the game for Next Generation stated that "It has its pluses and minuses, but they balance out to one of the most average RPGs you can imagine."  Regardless, the game has garnered a cult following and enjoyed various remasters and re-releases over the years.

By August 2008, Star Ocean: Second Evolution had sold 141,218 copies in Japan. Star Ocean: Second Evolution was the 90th best-selling game in Japan in 2008, selling 143,434 copies. By 2011, Second Evolution had sold 159,745 copies in Japan, bringing total worldwide sales of The Second Story and Second Evolution to 1,253,745 units.

Manga and anime adaptations

A seven-volume manga series was written and illustrated by Mayumi Azuma. Based on the tri-Ace role-playing video game of the same name, it follows the exploits of Claude C. Kenni, a young ensign in the Earth Federation who finds himself stranded on the Planet Expel. He meets Rena Lanford, a young girl living in the village of Arlia who declares that he is the legendary warrior their legends speak of who will save their troubled world from disaster.  The series was serialized in Shōnen Gangan, premiering June 22, 1999 and running until December 21, 2001, when it ended without reaching the conclusion of the story.

Studio Deen adapted the manga series into a twenty six episode anime series entitled Star Ocean EX which aired on TV Tokyo from April 3, 2001, until September 25, 2001. The anime series was released to Region 1 DVD by Geneon Entertainment.  To complete the story left unfinished by both the manga and anime, five drama CDs were released in Japan, using the same voice actors from the anime series.

Notes

References

External links
  (PSP) 
  (PSP)  (North America)
  (PSP)  (Europe)

1998 video games
Action role-playing video games
Enix games
PlayStation (console) games
PlayStation 3 games
PlayStation 4 games
PlayStation Portable games
PlayStation Vita games
Production I.G
Single-player video games
Space opera video games
Square Enix games
Star Ocean
Tose (company) games
Tri-Ace
Video game remakes
Video games scored by Motoi Sakuraba
Video games developed in Japan
Video games featuring female protagonists
Video games set on fictional planets
Video games with alternate endings
Video games set in the 25th century